Stuart Heap (born 7 February 1965) is an English footballer, who played as a midfielder in the Football League for Tranmere Rovers.

References

External links

Tranmere Rovers F.C. players
Clitheroe F.C. players
Colne Dynamoes F.C. players
Association football midfielders
English Football League players
1965 births
Living people
English footballers